Qullqiyuq Punta (Quechua qullqi silver, -yuq a suffix, punta peak; ridge, "the peak (or ridge) with silver", also spelled Collquiyoc Punta) is a mountain in the Cordillera Central in the Andes of Peru which reaches a height of approximately . It is located in the Lima Region, Yauyos Province, Tomas District.

References 

Mountains of Peru
Mountains of Lima Region